Sagenopteris trapialensis are leaves of extinct species of seed fern from Chubut, Patagonia Argentina.<ref name="Elgorriaga2019">{{cite journal |last1=Elgorriaga |first1=A. |last2=Escapa |first2=I. H. |last3=Cúneo |first3=R. |year=2019 |title=Southern Hemisphere Caytoniales: vegetative and reproductive remains from the Lonco Trapial Formation (Lower Jurassic), Patagonia. |journal= Journal of Systematic Palaeontology |volume=17 |issue=17 |pages=1257–1275 |doi= 10.1080/14772019.2018.1535456|s2cid=92287804 }}</ref> At the moment, S. trapialensis is based on impression fossils found in the Early Jurassic Lonco Trapial Formation near Paso del Sapo, Chubut Province.

 Description Sagenopteris trapialensis'' comprises palmately arranged leaves with 4 ovate to obovate leaflets with anastomosing venation. The central leaflets are almost symmetrical, whereas the lateral ones are markedly asymmetrical. Various types of anastomoses are present, and dichotomies are simple. Leaves of various sizes and forms were found, ranging from less than 5 mm. and up to 80 mm long.

References  

Pteridospermatophyta
Jurassic plants
Fossil record of plants
Jurassic first appearances
Jurassic extinctions
Early Jurassic life of South America
Jurassic Argentina
Fossils of Argentina
Fossil taxa described in 2019